"Again" is a popular song with music by Lionel Newman and words by Dorcas Cochran. It first appeared in the movie Road House (1948), sung by Ida Lupino. An instrumental rendition was used in the movie Pickup on South Street (1953). By 1949, versions by Vic Damone, Doris Day, Tommy Dorsey, Gordon Jenkins, Vera Lynn, Art Mooney, and Mel Tormé all made the Billboard charts.

Doris Day cover
The recording by Doris Day was recorded in February 1949 and released by Columbia Records as catalog number 38467. The flip side was "Everywhere You Go". It first reached the Billboard magazine Best Seller chart on May 13, 1949, and lasted 19 weeks on the chart, peaking at #2.

Vic Damone cover
The recording by Vic Damone was recorded in February 1949 and released by Mercury Records as catalog number 5261. The flip side was "I Love You So Much It Hurts". It first reached the Billboard magazine Best Seller chart on April 8, 1949, and lasted 15 weeks on the chart, peaking at #11.  Other sources give the highest chart position as #6.

Tommy Dorsey cover
The recording by Tommy Dorsey and his orchestra was released by RCA Victor Records as catalog number 20-3427. It first reached the Billboard magazine Best Seller chart on June 10, 1949, and lasted 9 weeks on the chart, peaking at #22. Other sources give the highest chart position as #6. The flip side, "The Hucklebuck", also charted.

Gordon Jenkins cover
The recording by Gordon Jenkins and his orchestra was made on February 17, 1949, and released by Decca Records as catalog number 24602. The flip side was "Skip to My Lou". It first reached the Billboard magazine Best Seller chart on April 15, 1949, and lasted 23 weeks on the chart, peaking at #2.

Vera Lynn
The recording by Vera Lynn, backed by Bob Farnon's orchestra, was released by London Records November, 1948 as catalog number 310. It first reached the Billboard magazine Best Seller chart on January 21, 1949, and lasted 3 weeks on the chart, peaking at #23. The B side was Lavender's Blue.

Art Mooney cover
The recording by Art Mooney and his orchestra was made on March 7, 1949, and released by MGM Records as catalog number 10398. The flip side was "Five Foot Two". It first reached the Billboard magazine Best Seller chart on July 15, 1949, at #28, its only week on the chart. Other sources give the highest chart position as #7.

Mel Tormé cover

The recording by Mel Tormé was released by Capitol Records as catalog number 15428. It first reached the Billboard magazine Best Seller chart on April 8, 1949, and lasted 18 weeks on the chart, peaking at #7. Other sources give the highest chart position as #3. The flip side, "Blue Moon", also charted.

Other recorded versions
Ricky Nelson Album "More Songs by Ricky" (1960).
Dinah Washington Album "The Two of Us" (1960).
The Four Freshmen – Voices In Latin (1958).
Tom Jones and Sondra Locke (duet) (The Tom Jones Show TV, 1981, and past – "Tom Jones – Duets" 1999, CD Album, UK Label: Point Entertainment)
The Lettermen - included in their album Jim, Tony and Bob. (1962).
Nat King Cole (1958) - appears on the compilation album Looking Back (1965) and on the compilation album Stardust: The Complete Capitol Recordings 1955-1959 (2006).
James Brown and The Famous Flames Released by King Records in 1964, catalog number 45-K11422
Ida Lupino (1948, in movie soundtrack)
Vera Lynn (new version, released as a single) (1960)
Frank Sinatra – CD boxed set "A Voice in Time" features a live 1949 recording from his radio show.
Clive Wayne, song with orchestra Conductor: Bruce Campbell. Recorded in London on July 7, 1949. It was released by EMI on the His Master's Voice label as catalog number B 9802.
Pat Boone - for his album Moonglow (1960).
Arthur Prysock (1965)
Cliff Richard Album Cliff Richard (1965)
 Higgs & Wilson single, Clan Disc (Jamaica), 1970.
 Pom Pom Squad, on Death of a Cheerleader (2021). Listed as "This Couldn't Happen"

References

1949 singles
1962 singles
Songs with music by Lionel Newman
Songs with lyrics by Dorcas Cochran
Vera Lynn songs
Doris Day songs
The Lettermen songs
Vic Damone songs
Mel Tormé songs
Capitol Records singles
1948 songs